Voznesenye is a rural locality (a selo) in Komyanskoye Rural Settlement, Gryazovetsky District, Vologda Oblast, Russia. The population was 2 as of 2002.

Geography 
Voznesenye is located 36 km northeast of Gryazovets (the district's administrative centre) by road. Popovka is the nearest rural locality.

References 

Rural localities in Gryazovetsky District